Jiu-Jitsu Federation of Rio de Janeiro also known as Jiu-Jitsu Federation of Guanabara is a governing body of Brazilian Jiu-Jitsu in the state of Rio de Janeiro, Brazil. The current president of the federation is 9th degree red belt Carlos Robson Gracie. The federation is the official certifying entity for Gracie jiu-jitsu. Specifically, it controls all teaching certifications, as well as all promotions to the rank of black belt and above.

Belt rankings

The federation awards a black belt after 6 to 15 years of jiu-jitsu practice. The black belt ranks as follows (from highest to lowest):

The correct positioning of the end bars and stripes is shown in the following video: https://youtu.be/kTr8bv0UfWE

The Coral belt is indicative of a professor who has decided to retire from fighting. This was shown when Rickson Gracie wore a 7th Degree solid Black belt.

All promotions involving any black belt rank require a recommendation of two masters and approval of at least five officials of the federation. Ranks below black belt are awarded by individual professors and are then confirmed publicly through competition with other students of the same rank. Beginners and new students wear a white belt. Adult belt levels progress from white to blue, then purple, and finally brown, after which the practitioner becomes eligible for a black belt. There is a larger number of belt colors for children.

Tournaments
 Grand Master Helio Gracie Championship
 State Championship
 Ryan Gracie No-Gi State Championship
 Carlson Gracie Cup
 Conde Koma Championship
 Rolls Gracie Championship

References

External links

Jiu-Jitsu Instruction

Brazilian jiu-jitsu organizations
Sport in Rio de Janeiro (state)